MICdb (Microsatellites database) is a database of non-redundant microsatellites from  prokaryotic genomes.

See also
 InSatDb
 Microsatellite

References

External links
 http://www.cdfd.org.in/micas

Biological databases
Repetitive DNA sequences
Genetics databases